Cypress Elementary School District is a public school district in Orange County, California. 

It serves Cypress and Buena Park.

References

External links
 

School districts in Orange County, California
Cypress, California
Buena Park, California